Harvey Allen Murphy Jr. (August 24, 1915 – May 25, 1992) was an American football end. A native of Richton, Mississippi, he played college football for Ole Miss. He then played professional football in the National Football League (NFL) for the  Cleveland Rams during the 1940 season. He appeared in two NFL games. He died in 1992 at age 76. He served in the Navy during World War II. He later worked as a Mississippi state trooper. He died in 1992.

References

1915 births
1992 deaths
Cleveland Rams players
Ole Miss Rebels football players
Players of American football from Mississippi